The New York City Procurement Policy Board (PPB) is an agency of the New York City government that regulates the procurement of goods, services, and construction that uses city money.

References

External links
 
 Procurement Policy Board in the Rules of the City of New York

Procurement Policy Board